Madanaiyakanahalli  is a village in the southern state of Karnataka, India. It is located in the Bangalore North taluk of Bangalore Urban district in Karnataka.  India census, Madanaiyakanahalli had a population of 5913 with 3176 males and 2737 females.

References

External links
 http://Bangalore Urban.nic.in/

Villages in Bangalore Urban district